The Deniliquin and Moama Railway Company was a railway company formed by a syndicate of Victorian capitalists to construct a railway from Moama to Deniliquin in New South Wales, Australia.

Background 
The rich Riverina district of New South Wales, which lies between the Murray and the Murrumbidgee Rivers, was handicapped in the middle of the 19th century by its distance from the seaboard. The Victorian Government sought to capture the trading potentialities of the area.

A broad gauge (1600mm) railway was opened between Melbourne and Echuca in 1864. Echuca lies on the Murray River, the southern border of New South Wales. Consequently, pressure arose to have the line extended across the river, northward to Deniliquin. However, the New South Wales Government was adamant in its refusal to construct a railway which, to a large extent, would have only served Victorian interests.

New South Wales concedes
In a weak moment during March 1874 and under considerable political pressure, the Government of New South Wales passed an Act which enabled the construction by a private syndicate of a 1600mm gauge railway from Moama to Deniliquin.

Construction 
Work commenced at Echuca where a junction was made with the Victorian northern railway. The initial crossing of the Murray was made over a temporary trestle bridge, 518m in length and built from red gum piles. As it was necessary to permit the passage of river craft, a lifting span was incorporated.

Clear of the Murray, the railway entered Moama. The country from Moama to Deniliquin comprises a series of almost level plains. The permanent way was laid on the surface and ballasted with sand. Throughout its length, there were only five curves of 1.6 km radius. The line was built within a period of 12 months.

Official opening 
On 4 July 1876, Moama celebrated the opening of the line with great gusto; a bullock being roasted and eaten in honour of the event. The Official gathering was held at Deniliquin where some 600 guests enjoyed the hospitality of the Directors of the company.

The only member of the NSW Legislature present at Deniliquin for the opening was the local Member for Murray, William Hay. Such was the disinterest by the NSW Government in providing a rail connection to the town that it was reputed to have quipped that "The New South Wales Government would as soon think of proposing to make a railway to the Moon as to Deniliquin". There remains no rail connection at Deniliquin with the NSW Railway system.

New bridge across the Murray
A contract was signed in September 1875 for an iron bridge to replace the temporary wooden one. A contemporary newspaper account highlights the terrors associated with the crossing of the original temporary bridge. "Frequently, passengers from Echuca would cross the river in a boat and board the train at Moama rather than risk what appeared to be a very perilous journey across the bridge. Passengers......state that the train appeared to crawl over the rickerty structure, which swayed and creaked as if it was going to collapse every minute and let the train.......drop into the swift-moving stream of the River Murray".

State acquisition 

On 1 December 1923, under the terms of the 1922 Border Railways Act, the Deniliquin and Moama Railway Company was taken over by the New South Wales government for transfer to the Victorian Railways. Since that date, the line has been part of the Victorian railway system.

Rolling stock

Locomotives

References

Defunct railway companies of Australia
1923 disestablishments in Australia
Australian companies established in 1876
Railway companies established in 1876
Railway companies disestablished in 1923